Wiang is a village and tambon (subdistrict) of Chiang Saen District, in Chiang Rai Province, Thailand. In 2005 it had a population of 10,807 people. The tambon contains 10 villages.

The Golden Triangle tri-point of Myanmar, Laos, and Thailand is found in the village of Ban Sop Ruak in the subdistrict.

References

Tambon of Chiang Rai province
Populated places in Chiang Rai province